Juaquin Hawkins (born July 2, 1973) is an American former professional basketball player. He played with the Houston Rockets during the 2002–03 NBA season.

Professional Basketball Career
After going undrafted in the 1996 NBA Draft, he signed a free agent contract to play with Kobe Bryant, Nick Van Exel, Shaquille O'Neal on the Los Angeles Lakers. He was one of the last cut from the final roster. After that, he played for the Hung Fu Rams in Taiwan and the Long Island Surf of the United States Basketball League. He played with the Los Angeles Clippers during the 1998 NBA preseason and was the last player cut. He then played with the Harlem Globetrotters in 1998 and 1999. After that, he played with the Fort Wayne Fury of the Continental Basketball Association along with future Rockets teammate Moochie Norris. After that, he played with the Southern California Surf of the ABA. In 2000–01, he played for Toyota Alvark in Japan. Finally, during the 2002–03 season, he made the Houston Rockets as the second oldest rookie in the NBA during that time. He even started 10 games that year.

After that year he went to veteran camps with the Golden State Warriors and was cut after a few games. He then played in the ABA with Dennis Rodman, Derrick Dial, Matt Barnes, and DeMarr Johnson and won a league championship. He then played in Japan, and in 2008, he helped the Gold Coast Blaze reach the playoffs in their inaugural season before being sidelined with an illness. He had a stroke after which some doctors thought he would never play again. After several months of speech and physical therapy he recovered and in 2009 he played in the IBL with the Los Angeles Lightning and won a championship. Other former NBA players Toby Bailey, Bryon Russell, Darrick Martin and Lamond Murray were a part of this team.

Houston Rockets and other NBA teams
Hawkins signed with the Houston Rockets of the NBA on September 30, 2002. On November 22, 2002, he put up career highs with 14 points, 8 rebounds, and 5 assists against the Washington Wizards. He suited up all 82 games for the Rockets as they missed the playoffs by one game.

Off the court
In 2010, Juaquin was featured along with his wife Kim Hawkins in episode 3 of the TV series Breakthrough with Tony Robbins.

Hawkins has co-written a book about his life, called Stroke of Grace, regarding his journey to the NBA and his experience suffering a devastating stroke.

References

External links
 Profile at Eurobasket.com
 NBA Historical Player Profile
 NBA Profile

1973 births
Living people
African-American basketball players
Alvark Tokyo players
American expatriate basketball people in Australia
American expatriate basketball people in Japan
American expatriate basketball people in the Philippines
American men's basketball players
Gold Coast Blaze players
Houston Rockets players
Long Beach State Beach men's basketball players
Panasonic Trians players
Sioux Falls Skyforce (CBA) players
Small forwards
Sun Rockers Shibuya players
Undrafted National Basketball Association players
21st-century African-American sportspeople
20th-century African-American sportspeople
Long Beach Jam players